Kenmore State High School is a secondary education institution in Brisbane, Queensland, Australia, with 1,960 students from grades seven through twelve in 2020.  The school was opened in 1972. Since that time, it has offered many extracurricular activities such as scuba diving and horseback riding. There is also a geography club which travels to Canada annually and had its 40th anniversary in 2012. In 2015, a grade seven cohort was added. 

Kenmore State High School has been accredited by the Council of International Schools (Australia).

School logo
Kenmore's logo is made up of five items: the Munich Emblem, the castle, the trees, the birds and the book. The Munich Emblem is a reminder of the school's foundation year – the year of the Munich Olympics.
The castle reminds of Kenmore Castle in Scotland; the home of some of the original settlers of Kenmore.
The birds and the trees are a symbol of the environmental focus of the school, and the book symbolises learning.

Sporting houses
Kenmore State High School has eight sporting houses, each with a name taken from the Aboriginal language of the district. The sporting houses are:

Bimbi – meaning "place of many birds".
Carrawah – meaning "plenty of birds come to rest here".
Tarcoola – meaning "a river bend".
Wyuna – meaning "clear water".
Allunga – meaning "beautiful place".
Jarrah – meaning "Eucalyptus tree".
Kinta – meaning "laughter".
Alkira – meaning "the sky".

Uniform
There is a multi-gender sport uniform consisting of a green, grey, and yellow polo shirt and basketball shorts. Formal uniform differs for male and female students, with the male uniform consisting of a white shirt and grey trousers, and the female uniform consisting of a grey skirt and white shirt. There are winter variations available for the uniforms. School ties are optional for senior and junior students. The school enforces a strict uniform policy, and failure to adhere to the policy can result in a detention for the offending student.

Students in Year 12 receive a jersey, with their choice of First or Last name on the back, alongside a two-digit number representing the year of graduation.

The Information Communication Extension Program 
Information Communication Extension (ICE) is a three-year program running from Years 7–9 oriented towards the use of technology in studies. It is arguably the least intensive out of Kenmore's extension programs, as it only contains one semester's worth of extra-curricular content. Students of the ICE program are by default equipped with more powerful laptops than their peers, as they rely on these extensively during and after their time in the program. Students of this program are required to take an additional specialised subject known as 'ICX' (Information Communication Extension) as one of their electives for one semester in Year 9. In this subject, students are tasked with investigating and solving current problems within the local community, obviously with the aid of technology.

The German Immersion Program
Kenmore State High is well known for its exchange programs, particularly the German Immersion Program (GIP). The students enrolled in the program have four years of intensive German, during which the students have mathematics, science, health and physical education, SOSE, geography and history in German. English and their elective subject are taught in English. At the conclusion of the fourth year, the students have the option to participate in an eight-week exchange with Engelsburg-Gymnasium in Kassel, Germany. The students stay for six weeks with a host family, and ten days touring Germany. The students' German exchange partners stay with the students in Brisbane the following year. Also at the beginning of their junior years, German immersion students go on camps together to build relationships with classmates.  In the last few years of school at Kenmore State High School, the students will not have the classes above (mathematics, Science etc.) in German, but they will still have after school sessions. After the conclusion of the program, students have the option to continue German studies in their senior year. Year 12 German is completed in year 11, and the program German Extension (GEX) is completed in year 12. Both of these subjects are OP eligible, allowing students to have a wider range of subjects to choose from, improving their OP.

The Music Extension Program
Music Extension (MEX) is a two-year program specifically designed to extend students who have already developed sound music reading and performing skills throughout the primary years of education. The program allows students to develop advanced skills in practical musicianship and theory alongside like-minded peers in a challenging environment. After two years, the program becomes optional, and in Grade 11 and 12 students are able to continue their musical studies with the option of taking Core Music as a subject. In Grade 12, Music Extension (MUX) is offered as a 7th subject, providing students with an opportunity to further extend their skills in their chosen area of either Performance or Composition, as well as an investigative Musicology essay alongside. This subject is OP eligible, and allows a wider range of subjects to choose from for OP selection and ranking.

The Zenith Program
Kenmore State High School offers a program for high performing academic students called The Zenith Program. Students must complete an ACER aptitude test as well as meeting other criteria to be considered as an entrant in the program. The Zenith Program enables students to participate in the Future Problem Solving Competition. Past teams of Kenmore State High School have successfully progressed to the next stage of competition, having competed nationally in Perth and Melbourne.

Controversies
In October 2020 Andrew Thomas Blight, the deputy principal of Kenmore State High School, received probation for forging doctors' scripts to obtain powerful painkillers. He pleaded guilty to one count of forgery, uttering and receiving tainted property; the scripts were for MS Contin and fentanyl.

In May 2021, several children from Kenmore High re-enacted the George Floyd incident, sparking controversy as it was reported on many news outlets, such as Nine News.

Notable alumni
 Jacinda Barrett (Hollywood actress)
 Paulie Bromley (musician)
 Cate and Bronte Campbell (Olympic swimmers)
 Michael Hepburn (cyclist)
 Monica Mayhem (pornographic actress)
 Erin McNaught (model and actress)
 Josh Thomas (comedian)

See also

List of schools in Queensland

References

Public high schools in Brisbane
Educational institutions established in 1972
1972 establishments in Australia
Kenmore, Queensland